Basic Color Terms: Their Universality and Evolution (1969) is a book by Brent Berlin and Paul Kay. Berlin and Kay's work proposed that the basic color terms in a culture, such as black, brown, or red, are predictable by the number of color terms the culture has. All cultures have terms for black/dark and white/bright. If a culture has three color terms, the third is red. If a culture has four, it has either yellow or green.

Berlin and Kay posit seven levels in which cultures fall, with Stage I languages having only the colors black (dark–cool) and white (light–warm). Languages in Stage VII have eight or more basic color terms. This includes English, which has eleven basic color terms. The authors theorize that as languages evolve, they acquire new basic color terms in a strict chronological sequence; if a basic color term is found in a language, then the colors of all earlier stages should also be present. The sequence is as follows:

Stage I: Dark-cool and light-warm (this covers a larger set of colors than just English "black" and "white".) 
Stage II: Red
Stage III: Either green or yellow
Stage IV: Both green and yellow
Stage V: Blue
Stage VI: Brown
Stage VII: Purple, pink, orange, or gray

The work has achieved widespread influence. However, the constraints in color-term ordering have been substantially loosened, both by Berlin and Kay in later publications, and by various critics. Barbara Saunders questioned the methodologies of data collection and the cultural assumptions underpinning the research, as has Stephen C. Levinson.


See also 
 Linguistic relativity and the color naming debate
 Blue–green distinction in language
 Color blindness

References

Further reading
 Witkowski, Stanley, and Brown, Cecil. (1977). "An Explanation of Color Nomenclature Universals." American Anthropologist, 79(1):50-57. 
 Saunders, Barbara and Brakel, J. van (Jaap) (Fall 2002). "The Trajectory of Color". Perspectives on Science, 10(3):302–355.
 Saunders, Barbara A. C. (1992). The Invention of Basic colour terms. Utrecht I.S.O.R.
 Newcomer, Peter and Faris, James (October 1971). "Basic Color Terms". International Journal of American Linguistics, 37(4):270–275.
 Kay, P. and McDaniel, K. (1978). "The Linguistic Significance of the Meanings of Basic Color Terms". Language, 54(3): 610–646.
 Levinson, Stephen C. (2000). "Yélî Dnye and the theory of basic color terms". Journal of Linguistic Anthropology 10(1):3–55.

External links
 "Revisiting Basic Color Terms", by Barbara Saunders. Paper presented to conference on Anthropology and Psychology: The Legacy of the Torres Strait Expedition, St. John's College, Cambridge 10–12 August 1998.
 Chapter 133: "Number of Basic Colour Categories", by Paul Kay and Luisa Maff, World Atlas for Language Structures Online.
 The World Color Survey by Paul Kay and Richard Cook.
 Chelsea Wald on Why red still means red in Arabic, Swahili, and English

1969 non-fiction books
Color names
Linguistics books
University of California Press books